Vettoor  is a panchayat in Varkala Taluk of Trivandrum district in the state of Kerala, India. It is situated 2.8km southwest of Varkala City and 38km northwest of capital city Trivandrum.

Demographics
 India census, Vettoor had a population of 36,818 with 16,409 males and 20,409 females.

References

Villages in Thiruvananthapuram district